Izghe is a village in Gwoza Local Government Area, Borno State, Nigeria.

An massacre by Boko Haram on 15 February 2014 left 106 residents of the village dead. A second raid occurred a few days later, in which the village was burned to the ground.

See also 
Izghe attack

References

Populated places in Borno State